José Miguel Fernández (born April 27, 1988) is a Cuban professional baseball infielder for the Saraperos de Saltillo of the Mexican League. He previously played in Major League Baseball (MLB) for the Los Angeles Angels, in the KBO League for the Doosan Bears, and for the Cuban national baseball team at the 2013 World Baseball Classic (WBC).

Professional career

Cuban career
Fernández played for Matanzas in the Cuban National Series (CNS).  In the 2014-15 season, he batted .326 with a .482 on-base percentage (OBP), .456 slugging percentage (SLG), 65 walks and 10 strikeouts in 314 plate appearances, ranking second in the league in OBP.  Baseball America ranked him as the #3 Cuban player in April 2015.  With a notoriety as contact hitter, Fernández struck out 113 times in 2,580 career CNS plate appearances, a 4.3 percent rate, compared with a 10.1 percent walk rate (263 total walks).  For his career in Cuba, Fernández batted .319 with a .403 OBP and .423 SLG.  In the 2013 World Baseball Classic (WBC), he took 21 turns at the plate, batting .524 with a .545 OBP and .667 SLG without striking out.

He did not play in any professional games in 2015 – including the CNS – as he was suspended for previously attempting to defect from Cuba and remained under heavy police guard.  On December 2, 2015, reports emerged that he had defected from Cuba.  However, at that time, he had yet to establish residency in another country, and still required clearance from Major League Baseball (MLB) to sign a free agent contract with a major league club.

Los Angeles Dodgers
On January 11, 2017, it was officially announced that he had signed a minor league contract with the Los Angeles Dodgers. The Dodgers assigned him to the Double-A Tulsa Drillers of the Texas League to start the 2017 season. He played in 90 games for them, with a .306 average, 16 homers and 64 RBI. He was released by the Dodgers on November 14, 2017.

Los Angeles Angels
On January 4, 2018, he signed a minor league contract with the Los Angeles Angels organization. He was assigned to the Triple-A Salt Lake Bees to begin the year. On June 8, 2018, Fernández was selected to the 40-man roster and promoted to the major leagues for the first time. He went 1-for-3 in his debut and played in 36 games for the Angels in his rookie season, logging a .267/.309/.388 slash line with 2 home runs and 11 RBI. On November 20, 2018, Fernández was designated for assignment by the Angels. Fernández was granted his unconditional release on November 21, 2018.

Doosan Bears
On December 26, 2018, Fernández signed a one-year, $700,000 contract with the Doosan Bears of the Korea Baseball Organization. In 2019, Fernández won the KBO League Korean Series final with Doosan, and was awarded a Gold Glove Award after the year. He also led the KBO in hits, with 197, and placed second in the regular season batting standings, with a .344 average.

Fernández re-signed with Doosan for the 2020 season, and slashed .340/.404/.497 with career-highs in home runs (21) and RBI (105). On December 23, 2020, Fernández again re-signed with the Bears for the 2021 season. He became a free agent following the 2022 season.

Saraperos de Saltillo
On January 9, 2023, Fernandez signed with the Saraperos de Saltillo of the Mexican League.

See also
List of baseball players who defected from Cuba

References

External links

1988 births
Living people
Major League Baseball players from Cuba
Cuban expatriate baseball players in the United States
Major League Baseball infielders
People from Colón, Cuba
2013 World Baseball Classic players
Los Angeles Angels players
Cocodrilos de Matanzas players
Águilas Cibaeñas players
Cuban expatriate baseball players in the Dominican Republic
Tulsa Drillers players
Oklahoma City Dodgers players
Salt Lake Bees players
Doosan Bears players
KBO League infielders
Cuban expatriate baseball players in South Korea
Estrellas Orientales players